A window is an opening in an otherwise solid, opaque surface, through which light can pass.

Window may also refer to:

Aeronautics
 Launch window, in aerospace, a time period in which a particular rocket must be launched
 Chaff (radar countermeasure), during World War II, the dropping of aluminium foil by aircraft to deceive radar installations

Arts and entertainment

Film
 Window, a 2005 film starring Louis Gossett Jr.

Literature
 "Window" (short story), a 1980 science-fiction short story by Bob Leman

Music
 Window (album), an album released by The Microphones in 2000

Songs
 "Window", by the Album Leaf from their 2004 album In a Safe Place
 "Window", by Fiona Apple from her 2005 album Extraordinary Machine
 "Window", by Genesis from their 1969 album From Genesis to Revelation
 "Window", by Still Woozy, 2020
 "Window", by Tyler, the Creator from his 2011 album Goblin

Computing
 Window (computing), a display rectangle used by a graphical user interface (GUI), or a text displayed at once among data of whole text
 X Window System, the system used by most Unix-like operating systems and OpenVMS
 A window in computer networking, a data transmission period, see sliding window protocol
 Register window, a feature of some CPUs
 Microsoft Windows, a computer operating system

People
 Window Snyder, former Mozilla Corporation security expert
 Muriel Window, (1892–1965), American actress, singer, vaudeville performer, businesswoman and Ziegfeld Girl

Science and technology
Atmospherics:
 Atmospheric or Astronomical window, those parts of the electromagnetic spectrum that are not absorbed by the earth's atmosphere
 Radio window
 Optical window
 Infrared window

Biology:
 Window period, in medicine, the time between first infection and detectability

Electronics:
 Window function, in signal processing, a function that is zero-valued outside of some chosen interval

Other uses:
 Window (geology) (or "fenster"), a hole in a thrust sheet through which the underlying rocks crop out
 Johari window, a technique to improve understanding of one's self and the perceptions of others
 Overton window, the range of political ideas the public will accept

See also
 The Window (disambiguation)
 Windows (disambiguation)
 Windowing (disambiguation)
 Window of opportunity
 First window (disambiguation)
 Second window (disambiguation)

bg:Windows
de:Windows (Begriffsklärung)
fr:Windows (homonymie)
ko:윈도
pl:Okno
simple:Windows
vi:Windows (định hướng)